Daniel Ian Hatcher (born 24 December 1983) is an English former professional footballer who played in the Football League, as a forward.

References

1983 births
Living people
People from Newport, Isle of Wight
English footballers
Association football forwards
Leyton Orient F.C. players
Newport (IOW) F.C. players
English Football League players